The men's pole vault at the 2019 World Athletics Championships was held at the Khalifa International Stadium in Doha from 28 September to 1 October 2019.

Summary
The field contained a who's who of contemporary pole vaulters, save 2015 champion Shawnacy Barber.  World record holder Renaud Lavillenie and 2011 champion Paweł Wojciechowski didn't make the final.  In the final, 2013 champion Raphael Holzdeppe and Olympic champion Thiago Braz bowed out, unable to clear 5.80m.  That height selected the medalists and it was the same three who had cleared 6 metres earlier in the season, all three perfect to that point.

At 5.87m, all three missed their first attempt.  Armand Duplantis cleared it on his second attempt, matched by Piotr Lisek, but defending champion Sam Kendricks missed again, not only taking him out of the lead, but leaving him only one more attempt to be allowed to continue.  He made an adjustment to the placement of his standards then made it for new life.  At 5.92m, Duplantis and Lisek missed their first attempts, Kendricks made his.  Advantage Kendricks. Duplantis missed his next attempt, then Lisek decided to go for the win and saved his two remaining attempts for the next height .  Now the pressure was on Duplantis.  He made his attempt, putting him into silver medal position.

At 5.97m, none of the three could get over on their first two attempts.  Lisek was eliminated and had to settle for bronze.  Again under pressure, Duplantis and Kendricks both made their final attempt.  The bar moved to 6.02m with Kendricks holding the lead.  Neither were able to make their first two attempts, when Duplantis failed a third time, Kendricks celebrated the successful defense of his title.

At the end of the competition, the medallists celebrated together on the pole vault mat. Their act of competitor camaraderie earned them a place on the shortlist for the International Fair Play Award.

Records
Before the competition records were as follows:

Qualification standard
The standard to qualify automatically for entry was 5.71 m.

Schedule
The event schedule, in local time (UTC+3), was as follows:

Results

Qualification
Qualification: 5.75 m (Q) or at least 12 best performers (q).

Final
The final was started on 1 October at 20:06.

References

Pole vault
Pole vault at the World Athletics Championships